Abul Hayat (born 7 September 1944) is a Bangladeshi actor. He is also a writer, civil engineer and director. He earned Bangladesh National Film Award for Best Supporting Actor for the film Daruchini Dwip (2007) and was awarded Ekushey Padak for his acting in 2015 by the Government of Bangladesh. He portrayed the Misir Ali character in the television film, Onno Bhuboner Cheleta.

Education
Hayat completed his bachelor's in civil engineering from Bangladesh University of Engineering and Technology (BUET).

Early life and career
Hayat was born on September 7, 1944, in Murshidabad, located in what is now known as West Bengal in India, to a Muslim family. He and his family later move to Chittagong in what was then East Pakistan due to his father's job transfer. He was an executive engineer of Dhaka WASA. Later, in 1978, he moved to Libya and worked there till 1981. He returned to Bangladesh in 1981 and started working in private job resigning from his government service.

Hayat acted in over 1000 television dramas. His debut rule in television was in Oedipus in 1969, and his debut film was Titash Ekti Nadir Naam,  a joint-venture film of India and Bangladesh released in 1973. He is the founder member of the theatre group Nagorik Natya Sampradaya.

As of February 2015, Hayat has written 28 books in total. He wrote his first book Trishnar Shanti in 1989.

Personal life
Hayat's two daughters, Bipasha Hayat and Natasha Hayat,  are actresses. His sons-in-law Tauquir Ahmed and Shahed Sharif Khan are actors too.

Filmography

Films

Television
 Ei Shob Din Ratri (1985)
 Bohubrihi (1988)
 Ayomoy (1990)
 Aaj Robibar (1999)
 Griho Golpo
 House Full (2008-2009)
 FnF (2010)
 House 44 (2015)
 Songshar (2016)
 Miss Sheuly (2019)
 Chan Biriyani (2020)
 Hoichoi Paribaar (2021)

Web series
 Nayan Rahasya Feluda (2019)
 Utsober Raat (2020)

Awards and nominations

References

External links
 

Living people
1944 births
People from Murshidabad district
Bangladesh University of Engineering and Technology alumni
Bangladeshi male film actors
Bangladeshi male television actors
Bangladeshi male stage actors
Recipients of the Ekushey Padak
Best Supporting Actor National Film Award (Bangladesh) winners